The men's road race at the 1958 UCI Road World Championships was the 25th edition of the event. The race took place on Sunday 31 August 1958 in Reims, France. The race was won by Ercole Baldini of Italy.

Final classification

References

Men's Road Race
UCI Road World Championships – Men's road race